Lionel James Gamlin (30 April 1903 – 16 October 1967) was a British radio and newsreel announcer and presenter, and actor, who was known for his work for the BBC and British Movietone News between the 1930s and 1950s.

Life and career
He was born in Birkenhead, and started on a career in business before joining a local repertory company and became a teacher at his old school before studying at Fitzwilliam House, Cambridge. At university he became President of the Cambridge Union in 1930 and editor of Granta. He returned to teaching and occasional work as an actor, before in 1936 being offered a post by the BBC as an announcer.

He provided the commentary in 1940 for both the RAF documentary Squadron 992 and the GPO Film Unit documentary War and Order, and compered the 1944 variety show Rainbow Round the Corner. During the Second World War, he was regarded as "a voice of authority, the tone of war and peace, the man whom people heard in the cinema on the newsreels." In 1946 he co-wrote a humorous book with Anthony Gilbert, Don’t Be Afreud! A Short Guide to Youth Control (The Book of the Weak), and in 1947 published You're on the Air: A Book about Broadcasting. He also chose the stage name of John Theobald Clarke, known as the actor and director Bryan Forbes.

In the late 1940s and 1950s he worked on BBC radio, presenting and conducting interviews on In Town Tonight, presenting Top of the Form, and producing children's programmes. He became "a stalwart of light entertainment broadcasting", was a castaway on Desert Island Discs in 1955, and lived close to Broadcasting House. He played little part in the growth of television broadcasting in the 1950s, although he did share interviewing duties with Eamonn Andrews on the film review programme Current Release. In his later years he worked as an occasional actor on such programmes as Dixon of Dock Green and Adam Adamant Lives!, and also as a valet. His last film role was in The Whisperers.

Gamlin was unmarried, and died in 1967 aged 64.

Posthumous allegations

In 2012, reports in the media relating to the Jimmy Savile sexual abuse scandal referred to Gamlin. Author Andrew O'Hagan alleged in the London Review of Books that, during the 1950s, Gamlin used a secret venue in Fitzrovia where he and another senior member of staff at the BBC regularly had sex with young boys.

References

1903 births
1967 deaths
English radio personalities
People from Birkenhead
Presidents of the Cambridge Union